Laersdrif (formerly Delagersdrift) is a small settlement in Elias Motsoaledi Local Municipality in the Limpopo province of South Africa. It is situated on the Laersdrifspruit, a tributary of the upper Steelpoort River, 27 km southwest of Roossenekal, 72 km northeast of Middelburg and 11 km north east of Stoffberg.

It was founded in 1907 on the farms Swartkoppies and De Lagersdrift, and proclaimed a township in July 1953. It takes its name from the latter farm, which in turn was named after a ford (Afrikaans: drif, Dutch: drift) at which a Boer commando laagered during the Mapoch War of 1882; a laager is laer in Afrikaans.

References

Populated places in the Elias Motsoaledi Local Municipality
Populated places established in 1907